The gain line, in rugby union, is an imaginary line (parallel to the halfway line) drawn across the pitch at the point where there is a breakdown in open play, such as a ruck, maul or scrum.  Advancing across the gain line represents a gain in territory.   Playing "beyond the gain line" is a common phrase coaches use to teach their players the fundamental goal of rugby (gaining space while maintaining possession of the ball).

References

Rugby union terminology